Yousuf Mohamed Ibrahim Bhailok (born September 1956) is a well known British businessman in Lancashire and the former general secretary of the Muslim Council of Britain. Bhailok made his money in property investments and development. In April 2016, it was reported that Bhailok was preparing a bid for parts of the former British Home Stores chain which was placed in administration earlier in April.

References 

Living people
1956 births
British businesspeople
British Muslims